Bruno Fantinato (born 7 November 1941) is an Italian racing cyclist. He rode in the 1964 Tour de France.

References

External links
 

1941 births
Living people
Italian male cyclists
Place of birth missing (living people)
Cyclists from the Province of Padua